6th Street may refer to:

Places
6th Street (Manhattan) in Manhattan, New York City
Sixth Street (Austin, Texas), a historic and entertainment district in Downtown Austin, Texas
Sixth Street (Wells, Nevada) in Wells, Nevada

Other uses
Sixth Street Partners, a global investment company